is a Japanese video game franchise created by Kazutaka Kodaka and developed and owned by Spike Chunsoft (formerly Spike). The series surrounds a group of high school students who are coerced into murdering each other by a creature named Monokuma. Gameplay features a mix of adventure, visual novel, and dating sim elements. The first game, Danganronpa: Trigger Happy Havoc, was released for the PlayStation Portable in 2010.

Media

Games
Main series

Spin-offs

Compilations

Anime

Manga
The following manga series have been produced:
 (Illustrated by Hajime Touya, published in Enterbrain's Famitsu Comic Clear from 24 June 2011 – 18 October 2013)
 - The Demo
 (Various artists, three volumes released between 25 July 2011 and 25 January 2014)
 (Various artists, three volumes released between 25 August 2011 and 25 February 2014)
 (Illustrated by Samurai Takashi, published in Kadokawa Shoten's Shonen Ace from July 2013 – July 2014, published in English by Dark Horse Comics starting in March 2016)
 (Various artists, released 27 August 2013)
 (Published in Famitsu Comic Clear from 10 December 2012)
 (Illustrated by Yoryu, published by Mag Garden from 30 October 2012 – 15 April 2013)
 (Illustrated by Kyosuke Suka, published by Mag Garden from 10 November 2012)
 (Illustrated by Karin Suzuragi, published in Mag Garden's Monthly Comic Blade from December 2012)
 (Illustrated by Ayune Araragi| published in GA Bunko's GA Bunko Magazine from 14 April 2013)
 (Various artists, four volumes released between 25 October 2012 and 25 October 2013)
 (Various artists, four volumes released between 24 November 2012 and 25 November 2013)

 (Illustrated by Machika Minami, published in Kadokawa Shoten's Dengeki Maoh from 27 January 2015)
 (Illustrated by Hajime Touya, published in Kadokawa Shoten's Famitsu Comic Clear from 20 February 2015)

 (Illustrated by Mitomo Sasako, published in Kodansha's Bessatsu Shōnen Magazine from 9 March 2016)
Revival Shot!: Danganronpa − Itagaki Hako Sakuhin Shuu (リバイバルショット! ダンガンロンパ板垣ハコ作品集)
Triple Bullet: Danganronpa − Watarizora Tsubamemaru Sakuhin Shuu (トリプルバレット ダンガンロンパ渡空燕丸作品集)
Danganronpa 3: The End Of Kibougamine Gakuen − Mirai Hen / Zetsubou Hen - Dengeki Comic Anthology (ダンガンロンパ3 The End of 希望ヶ峰学園 ー 未来編 / 絶望編 電撃コミックアンソロジー)
Danganronpa 3: The End Of Kibougamine Gakuen − Comic Anthology (ダンガンロンパ3 The End of 希望ヶ峰学園 コミックアンソロジー)

Novels

References

External links